Udeorah Uche (born 5 October 1985 in Kano) is a footballer who currently plays in the Nigerian Premier League for Giwa FC.

References

Living people
1985 births
Association football defenders
Nigerian footballers
Nasarawa United F.C. players
Giwa F.C. players
Sportspeople from Kano